Yevlashevo is a rural locality (a village) in Kubenskoye Rural Settlement, Vologodsky District, Vologda Oblast, Russia. The population was 27 as of 2002.

Geography 
Yevlashevo is located 36 km northwest of Vologda (the district's administrative centre) by road. Derevkovo is the nearest rural locality.

References 

Rural localities in Vologodsky District